Diou may refer to:

 Diou, Allier, a commune in the French department of Allier
 Diou, Indre, a commune in the French department of Indre
 Diou, Mali, a village and commune in Mali
 Paul Emile Diou (1855–1914), French general

See also 
 Diu (disambiguation)